Linda Itunu (born 21 November 1984) is a New Zealand rugby union player. She plays for the Black Ferns, New Zealand women's sevens and Auckland.

Itunu attended Kelston Girls' College in Auckland. She was a member of three successful Rugby World Cup campaigns in 2006, 2010 and 2017. She was also part of the 2013 Rugby World Cup Sevens Squad that won gold. She had won silver at the previous Sevens World Cup in Dubai.

Itunu was named in the squad to the 2014 Rugby World Cup in France. In 2015 she was included in the Black Ferns squad alongside her sister Aldora Itunu to play in the 2015 Women's Rugby Super Series in Canada.

After Retiring in 2018 from international rugby Itunu captained the Barbarians Women's team in 2019 for matches in Denver, Colorado against USA and England Rose in London, England.

References

External links
 Linda Itunu at Black Ferns
 

1984 births
Living people
New Zealand women's international rugby union players
New Zealand female rugby union players
New Zealand female rugby sevens players
New Zealand women's international rugby sevens players
Rugby union flankers
Auckland rugby union players
People educated at Kelston Girls' College